Holmium (III) nitrate is an inorganic compound, a salt of holmium and nitric acid with the chemical formula Ho(NO3)3. The compound forms yellowish crystals, dissolves in water, also forms crystalline hydrates.

Synthesis
Anhydrous salt is obtained by the action of nitrogen dioxide on holmium(III) oxide:

Effect of nitrogen dioxide on metallic holmium:

Reaction of holmium hydroxide and nitric acid:

Physical properties
Holmium(III) nitrate forms yellowish crystals.

Forms a crystalline hydrate of the composition Ho(NO3)3•5H2O.

Soluble in water and ethanol.

Chemical properties 
Hydrated holmitic nitrate thermally decomposes to form  and decomposes to holmium oxide upon subsequent heating.

Application
The compound is used for the production of ceramics and glass.

Also used to produce metallic holmium and as a chemical reagent.

References

Holmium compounds
Nitrates